Point Isabel Independent School District is a public school district based in Port Isabel, Texas, United States.

In addition to Port Isabel, the district serves the towns of Laguna Vista and South Padre Island, as well as the unincorporated Cameron County community of Laguna Heights.

In 2009, the school district was rated "academically acceptable" by the Texas Education Agency.

Schools
Port Isabel High School (grades 9-12)
Port Isabel Junior High School (grades 6-8)
Derry Elementary School (grades 3-5)
Garriga Elementary School (prekindergarten - grade 2)

References

External links

Point Isabel ISD

School districts in Cameron County, Texas